Defence Day is celebrated in Pakistan as national day to commemorate the sacrifices made by Pakistani soldiers in defending its borders. The date of 6 September marks the day in 1965 when Indian troops crossed the international border to launch an attack on Pakistani Punjab, in a riposte to Pakistan's Operation Grand Slam targeting Jammu. While it is officially commemorated as an unprovoked surprise attack by India, repulsed by the Pakistan Army despite its smaller size and fewer armaments, the narrative has been criticised by Indian commentators as representing false history.

Context of the 1965 War
The Indo-Pakistani War of 1965 began with Pakistan sending 7,000–8,000 specially trained Mujahid raiders into the Kashmir Valley with the objective of inciting the population into rebellion and dislocating the Indian Army installations. In the second stage, on 1 September, it launched a tank attack, dubbed Operation Grand Slam, towards the Akhnoor bridge in the Jammu Division. It was intended to be a "short and swift, fait accompli operation". According to scholar Shuja Nawaz, the Pakistani general intended to capture the Akhnoor bridge and swing towards Jammu to cut off India's communications with the Kashmir Valley. The Pakistanis had ignored the Indian Prime Minister's warnings that India would retaliate on Pakistan if Kashmir was attacked.

On 6 September, according to its "pre-declared strategy" of riposte, the Indian Army crossed the international border in Punjab with the objective of cutting off the Grand Trunk Road near Lahore. The attack came as a surprise to the Pakistani commanders. According to Air Marshal Nur Khan, the Army Chief General Musa Khan told the President on the second day of the war that the Army had run out of ammunition. He states that the Army suffered heavy losses in the war. On 23 September, Pakistan accepted a UN-mandated ceasefire.

Despite the historical fact that the war began with "Pakistani aggression", Pakistan instituted the Defence of Pakistan Day to commemorate the day when the Indian forces crossed into Pakistan. The narrative states that "[the] Indian forces sneaked [sic] into the Wagah border and the Pakistan armed forces, when alerted, put up a valiant defence of the motherland and drove them back, thus taking its name as the Defence of Pakistan Day." Air Marshal Nur Khan commented, "It was a wrong war and they misled the nation with a big lie that India, rather than Pakistan, had provoked the war and that we (Pakistanis) were the victims of the Indian aggression."

Celebrations and Parades
The Pakistan Army displays its latest missiles, tanks, guns, Pakistan Army Aviation helicopters and armament being used by Engineers, Electrical and Mechanical Corps, Army Air Defense, Signals, Army Service Corps and the Army Medical Corps. Everyone is allowed to watch such functions live by going to specific places. These shows are also displayed on national TV channels. National songs, special documentaries about 6 September 1965 and the stories of the people who were martyred on that day are displayed on TV. The facts are told of how people sacrificed their lives for the defense of the country and what the responsibility is of the younger generation, the children, who are the future of Pakistan.

The change of guard ceremony takes place at Mazar-e-Quaid, Karachi, where the cadets of Pakistan Air Force Academy present the Guard of Honour and take the charge.

Notes

References

Bibliography
 
 
 
 
 

Military of Pakistan
Parades in Pakistan
Public holidays in Pakistan
September observances